Walter Ignace d'Hondt (born September 11, 1936 in Richmond, Surrey, England) is a Canadian  rower and Olympic champion. He is the brother of Miss Canada 1959, Danica d'Hondt, who is a Canadian-American-British actress, restaurateur, and author.  He is the father of women's basketball player Gillian D'Hondt and the uncle of film actress, America Olivo. He was educated at The John Fisher School in Surrey.

He received a gold medal in coxless fours at the 1956 Summer Olympics in Melbourne, together with Archibald MacKinnon, Lorne Loomer and Donald Arnold.

At the 1958 British Empire and Commonwealth Games, D'Hondt received a gold medal in eights, and a silver medal in coxed fours. He received a silver medal in eights at the 1960 Summer Olympics in Rome, as a member of the Canadian team.

Awards
D'Hondt was inducted into the Canadian Olympic Hall of Fame in 1958. He was inducted into British Columbia Sports Hall of Fame in 1966, and into University of British Columbia Sports Hall of Fame in 1993, together with the other members of the Olympic gold team.

References

External links

1936 births
Living people
Canadian male rowers
Olympic rowers of Canada
Olympic gold medalists for Canada
Olympic silver medalists for Canada
People from Richmond, London
Rowers from Greater London
Rowers at the 1956 Summer Olympics
Rowers at the 1960 Summer Olympics
Rowers at the 1958 British Empire and Commonwealth Games
Commonwealth Games silver medallists for Canada
Commonwealth Games gold medallists for Canada
Olympic medalists in rowing
Medalists at the 1956 Summer Olympics
Medalists at the 1960 Summer Olympics
University of British Columbia alumni
Commonwealth Games medallists in rowing
Pan American Games medalists in rowing
Pan American Games silver medalists for Canada
Rowers at the 1959 Pan American Games
20th-century Canadian people
21st-century Canadian people
Medallists at the 1958 British Empire and Commonwealth Games